Lorna Jane Clarkson (née Smith, born 24 November 1964) is an Australian fashion designer, entrepreneur and author. She is the creator of the Lorna Jane brand of activewear for women, and owner of a chain of retail outlets that market the clothes. By 2015, the chain included 146 stores in Australia, 42 in the United States, and 54 stockists in other countries including South Africa, Britain, Canada, and Dubai.

In March 2013 and again in March 2014, Clarkson was included in the BRW  "Rich Women" list of the thirty wealthiest Australian women who had not inherited their money. Her fortune was reported at $40 million in 2013 and $50 million in 2014.

In 2020, the Australian Therapeutic Goods Association issued fines of approximately $40,000 against the company for alleged unlawful advertising claiming its clothes prevent and protect from infectious diseases, like COVID-19. Following a federal court ruling in 2021, the company admitted that Clarkson authorised and approved the misleading promotional material.

Early life
Clarkson was born Lorna Jane Smith in a small town in Lancashire, England, the younger of two sisters. Her mother, Jean Hale, a secretary, raised the girls as a single parent. The family emigrated to Brisbane, Australia, when Lorna was ten years old. As a child, she learned ballet, played netball, and was a school cheerleader. She attended Springwood State High School, and as a teenager, worked at Mathers shoe store in Woodridge Plaza. She wanted to become a journalist after high school, but was discouraged by her mother, so became a dental technician instead. While studying dental therapy, Smith began teaching aerobics at night.

After graduation, she worked for Queensland Health, and was posted to Cairns, where she provided dental care in schools. During her time in that city, Smith ran her first marathon, was crowned Miss Cairns, and met her future husband, Bill Clarkson. Smith continued to teach aerobics before and after work, conducting up to 13 classes per week, with up to 50 or 60 students per class. She also worked a third job, baking sugar-free cakes and vegetable frittatas for local cafes.

Smith started going by the name "Lorna Jane" to distinguish herself from another Lorna with whom she worked at one of her early employers.

Career
As a fitness instructor, Smith found a lack of appealing clothes in which to work and started to sew her own. She had no formal training in garment production, but had been interested in fashion since a teenager, crocheting bikinis from age 16, customising her clothes from age 18, and from age 21 starting to design and make her own clothes. She began by unpicking a favourite swimsuit and used it to make a pattern out of newspaper, providing the basis for her first leotard design. Her students liked her outfits, and started requesting that Smith make clothes for them too.

At the age of 24, she returned to Brisbane and continued teaching aerobics, now to classes of hundreds of students. She also continued sewing activewear for herself and on request. Smith enjoyed producing activewear so much that she decided to give up instructing and make it her full-time occupation. In 1989, the owner of the gym at which she worked offered her space for a studio above the gym, and also casual work as a receptionist if she needed extra money. She remembers the space as squalid, full of cockroach droppings that would be dislodged by the vibrations of people jumping around in the building. Her mother lent her money to fund increasing production, and to help her with her rent and costs of living.

Smith found that, at the time, nobody believed in her concept of stylish activewear. As she later recalled, even major brands like Nike did not have concept stores for their clothing in those days. When Bill Clarkson showed the products to major department store Myer, their fashion buyers were uninterested and unsure of how to position the garments. He recalls that when he explained the clothes should not be sold in the sports section, "The buyer looked at me like I was crazy. They had no box to put me in." Eventually, Myer bought a small range for five of their stores and stocked it in a corner between swimwear and lingerie. The Lorna Jane corporate website goes so far as to credit Smith with coining the word "activewear" in 1989, although the Merriam-Webster dictionary notes the word's first known usage was in 1924.  

Deciding to retail the Lorna Jane label themselves, in 1990, Smith and Clarkson opened their first store, in an upper floor of Brisbane's Broadway on the Mall shopping centre. Early successes confirmed for Smith the viability of her dream. The business covered its first week of rent with its first day of sales, and in 1991, a customer bought the entire stock of the second Lorna Jane store in a single purchase of $25,000 with the intention of reselling it. Smith and Clarkson were ecstatic at the windfall, until they realised that this meant they had no stock left. The story of Clarkson riding back to Smith's workshop on a bicycle with $25,000 cash in a bag has become a famous anecdote about the early successes of the business.

After establishing the Lorna Jane business, Clarkson studied fashion at TAFE college and was awarded a Diploma of Fashion. She later said that, in hindsight, earning this qualification was unnecessary because of the practical experience she had already gained.

On 11 September 1994, Smith married Clarkson.

By 2000, the business required a larger factory, and to fund this expansion, the Clarksons sold their home in the Brisbane suburb of Paddington for $450,000. Clarkson described the house they sold as their "dream home", in which they had planned to spend the rest of their lives. They had spent seven years renovating it, and from its back deck, they could see the church in which they had married. The couple put the money from the sale of their home towards the purchase of a factory building in Fortitude Valley for $465,000. They refurbished it for clothes production, and built an apartment living space above it. When they purchased it, the building was "dirty and full of termites", but within two years, the value of their factory property had appreciated to $4 million, which the Clarksons were able to use as collateral for further growth.

Clarkson and her husband, Bill, retain a 60% stake in the Lorna Jane brand, after private equity firm CHAMP Ventures purchased a 40% stake in 2010. In 2016, the overall value of the business was estimated at $500 million, with an annual revenue for 2014 estimated at $200 million. 

In 2014, the Clarksons considered selling the business, but eventually withdrew when they considered the implications of losing their personal control of what they had built. During a personal appearance the following year, Clarkson said that she would be "half a person without the brand", and "I just don't know what I would do without it."

During 2015, the Lorna Jane company received public criticism over a range of issues, including allegations that a former manager had been bullied at work because of her body shape, and separately, over a job ad the company posted for a receptionist who had to satisfy certain physical characteristics so that she could also work as a fitting model for garment development. A year later, Clarkson said that as stressful as it was for her personally to deal with these issues, she came to see it as a blessing in disguise because it allowed her to expose a fragile, human side to the public.

With the Clarksons spending increasing amounts of time in the United States to oversee the brand's expansion into that country, they bought a property in Santa Monica, California in early 2016. The property has two large houses on it; one in which they live, and the other which they have fitted out as a design studio for Lorna.

Clarkson has published six books on health and wellbeing: Move, Nourish, Believe: The Fit Woman's Secret Revealed (2011), MORE of the Fit Woman's Secrets (2013), NOURISH - The Fit Woman's Cookbook (2014),  INSPIRED (2015), Love You (2017), and Eat Good Food (2018).

Personal life
Clarkson says that she made a conscious decision not to have children because she did not want to lose focus on her career, and because she never felt passionate about being a mother.

She owns a Moodle named Roger (born 6 September 2011). In 2014, she said that if price were no object, she would convince her husband that buying Roger a Hermès collar as a birthday present would be a great idea. Roger has his own Instagram account.

The Clarksons paid $10.3 million for a riverfront home in Hamilton, which was the most expensive residential property purchase in Brisbane for the year 2010. As of May 2015, it was still the fourth-most expensive residential property purchase in Brisbane ever.

Clarkson builds daily rituals into her life to make sure she makes time for things that are important to her. Every night "for as long as [she] can remember", she lays out her activewear for the next day as a reminder to change into it as soon as she wakes up. She is an early riser, and begins her day with an hour of "me time" followed by physical activity in the form of yoga, lifting weights, or walking her dog. She finds that this morning ritual gives her energy and a positive mindset for the day. In 2014, she was doing strength training twice a week, yoga or stretching "every single day" and two or three fitness classes a week. She was also exploring barre fitness as a new activity. She says that most of her design ideas come to her while she is exercising.

Clarkson cites her favourite designers as Helmut Lang, Manolo Blahnik, Isabel Marant, and Chanel. She admires Oprah Winfrey as a female leader, Steve Jobs for remaining true to his vision, Bono, and Al Gore, but says that her husband, Bill, is her biggest source of inspiration. She has collected inspirational quotes, images, and mantras her "whole life" and has mood boards all over her home.

Clarkson believes strongly in not living beyond her means, personally or professionally, and aims to stay debt-free. She says that this was the best piece of advice her mother imparted to her, and has never paid interest on consumer credit. She also prides herself on her hands-on approach to business, and in 2012 was still going into the office every day, often the first to arrive and last to leave. She said she will still "get into the trenches and fix the seam on the inside of a tight." Clarkson says: "My professional and personal goals are pretty much the same: I want to continue to inspire and encourage women all over the world to live a more active life." Clarkson conducts her public appearances in activewear, finding this to be more authentic to herself than businesswear. In a 2014 interview, she said that "the days of activewear being confined to the gym are well and truly over." She believes that her authenticity as a key element of her success. 

In December 2020, the Australian Competition & Consumer Commission (ACCC) initiated legal action against Lorna Jane after the company released its new LJ Shield product which it claimed stopped the spread of Coronavirus, advertising it as "a groundbreaking technology" which prevented the "transferal of all pathogens". In July 2021, a federal court judge found that Lorna Jane "represented to consumers that it had a reasonable scientific or technological basis" to make its claims when it had none. The company admitted that Clarkson authorised and approved the LJ Shield activewear promotional material and personally made some false statements in a press release and an Instagram video.

Notes

References

External links
 Clarkson's Instagram account
 Instagram account of Clarkson's dog, Roger

1964 births
Living people
Australian fashion designers
Women cookbook writers
Australian women fashion designers
Australian writers
Australian women company founders
Australian company founders